Al khadra may refer to:

 Al khadra', Jizan, Saudi Arabia
 Al khadra', Makkah, Saudi Arabia